, also called Miku Hatsune, and officially code-named CV01, is a Vocaloid software voicebank developed by Crypton Future Media and its official anthropomorphic mascot character, a 16-year-old girl with long, turquoise twintails. Miku's personification has been marketed as a virtual idol, and has performed at live virtual concerts onstage as an animated projection (rear-cast projection on a specially coated glass screen).

Miku uses Yamaha Corporation's Vocaloid 2, Vocaloid 3, and Vocaloid 4 singing synthesizing technologies. She also uses Crypton Future Media's Piapro Studio, a standalone singing synthesizer editor. She was the second Vocaloid sold using the Vocaloid 2 engine and the first Japanese Vocaloid to use the Japanese version of the 2 engine. The voice is modeled from Japanese voice actress Saki Fujita. 

The number 01 can also be seen on her left shoulder in official artwork.

Development 
Hatsune Miku was the first Vocaloid developed by Crypton Future Media after they handled the release of the Yamaha vocal Meiko and Kaito. Miku was intended to be the first of a series of Vocaloids called the "Character Vocal Series" (abbreviated "CV Series"), which included Kagamine Rin/Len and Megurine Luka. Each had a particular concept and vocal direction.

She was built using Yamaha's Vocaloid 2 technology, and later updated to newer engine versions. She was created by taking vocal samples from voice actress Saki Fujita at a controlled pitch and tone. Those samples all contain a single Japanese phonic that, when strung together, creates full lyrics and phrases. The pitch of the samples was to be altered by the synthesizer engine and constructed into a keyboard-style instrument within the Vocaloid software. 

Crypton released Hatsune Miku on August 31, 2007. Crypton had the idea to release Miku as "an android diva in the near-future world where songs are lost." Hatsune Miku was released for Vocaloid 3 on August 31, 2013, including an English vocal library. She was the first Vocaloid to be developed by the company, following their commercial release handle of Yamaha Corporation developed vocals "Meiko" and "Kaito", making Hatsune Miku the third Vocaloid to be sold commercially by the company.

Additional software 
On April 30, 2010, a new add-on for Vocaloid 2 called Hatsune Miku Append, was released, consisting of six different timbres for the voice: Soft (gentle timbre), Sweet (young, chibi quality), Dark (mature and melancholic), Vivid (bright and cheerful), Solid (loud, clear voice), and Light (innocent and angelic). Miku Append was created to expand Miku's voice library, and as such requires the original program to be installed on the user's computer first. This was the first time a Vocaloid had such a release, and more Append versions were reported from Crypton Future Media at later dates.

It was mentioned that a 7th Append voicebank, a falsetto voice, had been recorded; however, since the developers didn't think it would be useful on its own, no plans were made for an independent release. During the Kagamine Append development, a "darkish Whisper/Sweet" append was being considered. Miku's English vocal was also due for a Vocaloid 2 release, but it was not released in the engine due to low quality.

To aid in the production of 3D animations, the program MikuMikuDance was developed by an independent programmer. The freeware software allowed a boom in fan-made animations to be developed, as well as being a boost for promoting Vocaloid songs themselves. This spawned "NicoNico Cho Party", where fans could submit their animations to accompany live holographic performances of popular Vocaloid songs.

An English voicebank for Hatsune Miku was announced in 2011 and was to be released by the end of 2012. However, the decision to move to Vocaloid 3 and issues with English pronunciation delayed the release. It was finally released on August 31, 2013 via digital distribution.

The Hatsune Miku Vocaloid 3 Japanese vocal library was released on September 26, 2013. It contained updates to all previous Vocaloid 2 vocals except Vivid and Light. These were later released separately, though they were initially offered to anyone who already owned Hatsune Miku, Hatsune Miku Append, and Hatsune Miku V3. Once imported into Vocaloid4, all Vocaloid3 Hatsune Miku vocals could use the new Cross-Synthesis system (XSY) built for the new engine of Vocaloid 3. The voice was also imported into a device called Pocket Miku, released on April 3, 2014.

Hatsune Miku received an update for Yamaha's Vocaloid 4 engine under the name of Hatsune Miku V4X. It makes use of the new EVEC system for Piapro Studio, a VSTi plugin used as an alternative to the traditional Vocaloid Editor. EVEC consists of recorded vowels. Along with the consonant, a different vocal tone can be achieved. Two vocal tones are included in the EVEC system: Power and Soft. Along with the new EVEC system, phoneme errors found in Miku's V2 and V3 voicebanks would be fixed allowing for easier manipulation of the software's voice. , Hatsune Miku V4X/V4 English was released.

A Mandarin Chinese voicebank was released in September 2017, making Hatsune Miku the first trilingual Vocaloid product.

Marketing 
Miku has been heavily promoted since 2008 and was originally aimed at professional musicians. On September 12, 2007, Amazon.co.jp reported sales of Hatsune Miku totaling 57,500,000 yen, making the character the number-one-selling software of that time. She was the first vocal to be developed and distributed by Crypton Future Media and sung in Japanese. Hatsune Miku's instant success is owed to Vocaloid being a cultural hit in Japan and she reportedly sold 40,000 units by July 2008, selling on average 300 units a week. By January 2011, she had sold 60,000 units.

Merchandising 
Since the success of Hatsune Miku's Vocaloid 2 package led to an expansion of marketing possibilities, most of the mass marketing has come after the software's initial release as a response to Miku's popularity and has been on going since 2008. Even with the addition of other Character Vocals, Miku's name continues to be used as the primary source of marketing for Crypton Future Media, to the point where most products for their Vocaloid related products will usually only feature Hatsune Miku's name. In March 2012, the Nomura Research Institute estimated that the sales of all Hatsune Miku brand goods added up into the region of  since the release in 2007. Her name is easily the most recognizable of all Vocaloids.

In 2011, Crypton began to focus on marketing Miku to United States audiences. On May 7, Amazon placed a preview of Supercell's hit song, "World is Mine", as a single. When the song finally went on sale, it ranked at No. 7 in the top 10 world singles list on iTunes in its first week of sales. Since Crypton had always sold Miku as a virtual instrument in Japan, they asked their Japanese fan base if it was acceptable for them to sell her as a virtual singer to the new market audience. The main purpose of the Miku English version is to allow Japanese producers to break into the western market and expand their audiences.

Good Smile Racing 

In 2008, Good Smile Racing began the licensing of Hatsune Miku and other Crypton Future Media-related Vocaloid content. Studie, which participated in the 2008 and 2009 seasons using a BMW Z4 E86. Their car was painted in official Hatsune Miku art, and fan-derivative versions of Hatsune Miku in some races in the 2009 season. In the 2008 season, a group of "Racing Queens" were seen in the pitstop of races. Dubbed the "MikuMiku Gals", the three girls were Rin Miyama, Riona Osaki and Hina Saito. In 2009, a new set of MikuMiku Gals were introduced; these girls wore outfits based on all three Character Vocal series females and not specifically Hatsune Miku alone. Hiroko Nagano, Atsuko and Ayami were the Racing Queens for the season.

Team COX, participating in the 2010 season, which uses a Porsche 996 GT3 RSR (and will use a Porsche 997 GT3-R). Their car uses Racing Miku (an official Hatsune Miku derivative wearing an orange racing queen suit) as their image. 2010 was also the first season to receive the first official "Racing Miku" derivative design, and from this season onward, the Racing Queens outfits were based on the season's derivative design. The designer of the 2010 outfit was illustrator Redjuice. Model Ayami returned for this season as a Racing Queen and was joined by fellow models Saki Tachibana and Shihomi Kogoshi.

GSR and Studie with TeamUKYO was the sponsorship for the 2011 season. The designer of the 2011 Racing Miku derivative design was illustrator Yuichi Murakami. Ayami returned as a Racing Queen for the third time and Tachibana Saki returned for a second season. Haruka Aoi was the third Racing Queen to wear the Racing Miku 2011 outfit. GSR and Studie with TeamUKYO was continued as a sponsorship for the 2012 season. The Racing Miku design was illustrated by Gan for this season. The Racing queens for the season were returning models Tachibana Saki and Aoi Haruka, as well as new models Sena Kougami and Ayana Sato.

The Studie with TeamUKYO sponsorship continued with the 2013 season. The Racing Miku design for the season was done by Mari Shimazaki. The illustrator of the official art was Saitom. Sena Kougami returned as a racing queen for this season and was joined by Tsukasa Arai and Elena Ishiguro. In 2013, the sponsorship expanded to feature a team in the Isle of Man TT, called Team Mirai, with a Racing Miku-designed bike. They finished 6th with Ian Lougher after a fatal accident struck Yoshinari Matsushita (who rode another bike, a Suzuki 600cc) during practice at Ballacrye Corner. The Racing Miku design also was adapted for a "Sepang" version showing bare toned skin as part of showing good health and promoting the design as "the Angel of summer".

The illustrator for the 2014 season was Oguchi, one of the 15 artists of Kantai Collection. The outfit is designed by Koyamashigeto, the art director of Kill la Kill. The machine version of the outfit is designed by Koyamashigeto and Shōji Kawamori, who is noted for his "Macross" designs. The Racing Queens who wore the outfit were returning models Tsukasa Arai and Sena Kougami, as well as new models Kelal Yamaura and Noa Mizutani. For the 2015 Racing Miku, the design was based on a "Princess Knight" complete with a shield and spear-like umbrella. The illustrator was Taiki, the lead visual design from Square Enix and Sega's games Lord of Vermilion and Rise of Mana. Koyamashigeto once again returned as the art direction and designer for the season. Tsuyoshi Kusano is in charge of the new machine design.

Winter festivals 
Sapporo has been a major main target of sponsorship since 2010, with Crypton Future Media sponsoring the winter festivals. The image of Hatsune Miku would appear around the town on public transportation. The image portrayal of Miku that is used is a derivative design called "Snow Miku". Although originally, this was simply a recoloring of the normal Hatsune Miku, unique designs have occurred every year since 2011. Figurines based on the design have also been featured.

The 2012 design was chosen via a contest. The winning entry was referred to as "Fluffy Coat Snow Miku". The 2013 design was called "Strawberry Daifuku Shiromuku Miku". The 2014 design was based on a Magical Girl design by dera_fury, who was the winner of the 2014 Snow Miku contest. The illustration was "Nekosumi". The design also featured a pet called "Rabbit Yukine". The 2015 design was called "Snow Bell Snow Miku" and was illustrated by Nardack.

In 2012, several ice sculptures of the Character Vocal series and several snow sculptures of Miku were produced for the event. However, on February 7, 2012, one of the Snow Miku sculptures later collapsed and had to be rebuilt elsewhere with better support. The collapsed figure also hit a woman in her early 60s on the back of the head; no serious injuries were sustained in the process.

During Miku's development, Crypton decided to take a different approach from that used by the other Vocaloid sound bank publishers. It was decided that to make the product successful not only would a highly appealing voice need to be developed, but that the voice needed an image. She was originally aimed only at professional producers; the amateur and otaku market had not fully formed yet, and so were not initially considered.

The task for coming up with Miku's image went to the manga artist Kei Garō. When Kei designed Miku, his only direction was that she was an android and what her color scheme (based on Yamaha's synthesizer's signature turquoise color) was. The design on Miku's skirt and boots are based on synthesizer software colors and the bars represent the actual bars within the program's user interface. Miku was originally intended to have a different hairstyle, but Kei stuck to pigtails or bunches after trying them out.

Cultural impact 

Nico Nico Douga, a Japanese video streaming website similar to YouTube, played a fundamental role in the recognition and popularity of the software. Soon after Miku's release, Nico Nico Douga users started posting videos of songs created using the character's sound bank. According to Crypton, a popular video featuring Miku's chibi version, Hachune Miku, singing and dancing to "Ievan Polkka" while spinning a Welsh onion in homage to Loituma Girl's original video (which led to Miku also being commonly associated with spring onions) demonstrated the potential of the software in multimedia content creation. As Miku's recognition and popularity grew, Nico Nico Douga became a place for collaborative content creation. Popular original songs written by a user would inspire illustrations, animations in 2D and 3D, and remixes by other users. Some creators would show their unfinished work and ask for ideas.

In September 2009, three figurines based on the derivative character "Hachune Miku" were launched in a rocket from the United States state of Nevada's Black Rock Desert, though it did not reach outer space. In late November 2009, a petition was launched in order to get a custom-made Hatsune Miku aluminium plate (8 cm × 12 cm, 3.1" × 4.7") made that would be used as a balancing weight for the Japanese Venus spacecraft explorer Akatsuki. Started by Hatsune Miku fan Sumio Morioka (also known as "chodenzi-P"), this project has received the backing of Dr. Seiichi Sakamoto of the Japan Aerospace Exploration Agency. On December 22, 2009, the petition exceeded the needed 10,000 signatures necessary to have the plates made. An original deadline of December 20, 2009, had been set to send in the petition, but due to a couple of delays in the Akatsuki project, a new deadline of January 6, 2010, was set; by this deadline, over 14,000 signatures had been received. On May 21, 2010 at 06:58:22 (JST), Akatsuki was launched, having three plates depicting Hatsune Miku and Hachune Miku in several monochrome images, composed of the miniature letters of the messages from the petition form etched in the plates. The UK 59th issue of the music and fashion magazine Clash featured Hatsune Miku as their cover star (using a real-life photo model), with a full feature on her. The third launch of the MOMO sounding rocket by Interstellar Technologies used Hatsune Miku's voice for the countdown.

The Vocaloid software has also had a great influence on the character Black Rock Shooter, who looks like Hatsune Miku but is not linked to her by design. The character was made famous by the song "Black Rock Shooter", and a number of figurines have been made. An original video animation made by Ordet was streamed for free as part of a promotional campaign running from June 25 to August 31, 2010. A televised anime series aired in February 2012.

In October 2011, Crypton showed on the official Hatsune Miku Facebook page a letter from the Japanese Minister of Economy for "contributing to the furtherance of the informatization by minister of economy." The flag of the city of Chiba was considered to coincidentally resemble the silhouette of Hatsune Miku, and on the 10th anniversary on August 31, 2017, the municipal government website temporarily changed its logo to look like Miku. Geoffrey Cain of GlobalPost has argued that the phenomenon of Hatsune Miku is partly due to the love of Japanese for giving inanimate objects a soul, which is rooted in Shintoism or animism, but also in the long tradition of Karakuri ningyō or automated wooden puppets. Thus, Japanese are much more ready to accept a virtual character as "human".

Hatsune Miku is often jokingly attributed as the creator of the video game Minecraft (originating from the Miku Twitter parody account mikumiku_ebooks which tweeted "i created minecraft") as well as the book series Harry Potter. Both of these attributions came about after the original creators of both works (Markus Persson and J. K. Rowling, respectively) published tweets that were critical of transgender people, which resulted in backlash from their respective fans.

Appearances in other media 
Miku's popularity has resulted in various references to her in anime. Miku is the protagonist of a manga series named Maker Hikōshiki Hatsune Mix, written by Kei Garō. The manga explores the many possibilities of story-telling and has featured numerous adventures, ranging from giant-sized battles with Hatsune Miku to home exploits. There is therefore no single storyline, and the entire setting within the manga is unofficial. During an episode of Zoku Sayonara, Zetsubou Sensei, Miku is seen auditioning for the voice of Meru Otonashi (Kagamine Rin and Len are referenced in the same episode). Miku's voice is used in one of the ending themes for the anime series Akikan! (episode 12). Moreover, she also sings the ending theme for the anime Yamishibai: Japanese Ghost Stories, called . During an episode in the Lucky Star OVA, Kagami Hiiragi gets magically transformed into Miku cosplay. A character in the anime Kämpfer appears dressed as Miku in episode seven. She also appeared in the large plasma screen in Chrome Shelled Regios as an endorser. She also appears in episode 11 of Baka and Test as a member of class B. Miku also appears in Maria Holic episode 12, when the class is told they have a swim meet. Miku also appears in episode 1 of Himōto! Umaru-chan, in an imagination of what the main character wants to buy. A parody of Miku is also seen in Gintama (episode 237) in the second editor of Gintaman, Daito's anime fantasies. Miku also appeared in the anime Shinkansen Henkei Robo Shinkalion the Animation as a recurring character. Miku appears as a recurring guest character in 2022's Dropkick on My Devil! X, the third anime season based on Yukiwo's Dropkick on My Devil! manga series, voiced by Saki Fujita as opposed to having lines recorded through the Vocaloid software.

A series of rhythm games starting from Hatsune Miku: Project DIVA were produced by Sega under license using Hatsune Miku and other Crypton Vocaloids, as well as "fan-made" Vocaloids like Akita Neru. The series has sold 6million copies. Hatsune Miku and Future Stars: Project Mirai was developed for the Nintendo 3DS. Miku's appearance in this game is based on the Nendoroid series of figures. Later on, a mobile gacha rhythm game called Project SEKAI: Colorful Stage! (marketed as Hatsune Miku: Colorful Stage! outside of Asia) was released. The game features Miku as well as the other Crypton Vocaloids alongside original human characters. Many of the game's playable songs are covers of existing Vocaloid originals. Hatsune Miku is also briefly referenced in the game Recettear, where a young man stargazing sees "The Green-Onion Girl" constellation. Also, in 2013, Saki Fujita voices Fei-Yen HD, a character based on one of Hatsune Miku's modules, in Super Robot Wars UX; this appearance does not use Miku's vocal library. Haruka Sawamura from the Yakuza series, another Sega franchise, can wear Miku's outfit in Yakuza 5, and an ice statue of Miku is also seen in the Sapporo region of the game. TinierMe also made attire that looks like Miku's for their services, allowing users to make their avatar resemble her.

Miku's clothes appear as a costume for a playable character in the Japanese version of PangYa and was the back-up vocal for the game's season four trailer, as a downloadable costume for Sophie in Tales of Graces and is seen during a stage in the game 13-sai no Hellowork DS. Miku's clothes also appear in Phantasy Star Portable 2 as a costume for the player's female character, as well as her hairstyle and leek-themed weapons. Miku appears in the PlayStation 3 version of The Idolm@ster 2 as downloadable content. In the video game Skullgirls, one of Filia's alternative colors is based on Miku. Hatsune Miku's attire has also appeared in Phantasy Star Online 2 as a female character's costume, along with "Miku Dayō" as a Mag Design. She also makes an appearance in the game Brave Frontier.

In 2014, Korg introduced "Miku Stomp", a guitar effects unit that emulates the sound of Miku's voice. "Tell Your World" by Livetune, which features her as a featured artist, appears in Japan's Just Dance Wii U. In 2015, "Ievan Polkka" was announced to appear in Just Dance 2016 along with a dancer whose outfit is exactly like Miku's. On July 23, 2015, Miku was announced as a DLC character in Persona 4: Dancing All Night, a video game released in 2015 for the PlayStation Vita and developed by Atlus. On November 26, 2015, Miku became a collaboration idol for the second update of the 2016 series of the Aikatsu! arcade game. Several cards containing Hatsune Miku uniforms were also included for the update. In 2016, a remix of "Ievan Polkka" appeared on an LG G5 commercial. "PoPiPo" was announced to appear in Just Dance 2017 also with a dancer whose resembles Miku. Then, "Love Ward" by OSTER project was also announced to appear in Just Dance 2018 with the same Miku-resembling dancer. In March 2017, Miku was introduced as a playable character in the mobile game '#COMPASS'. In fall 2017, Hatsune Miku was added as a playable character in PriPara. "Love Ward" and "PoPiPo" are still available in future Just Dance games as part of Ubisoft's Just Dance Unlimited service for Just Dance 2016 onwards.

In August 2017, to celebrate the 10th anniversary of the virtual singer, Ricoh released a limited edition of its 360° camera Ricoh Theta branded with Hatsune Miku imagery called the Ricoh Theta SC Type Hatsune Miku. The Ricoh Theta Type Hatsune Miku mobile apps (iOS and Android) allow for placing images of the character (in 55 different poses) within 360° images taken with the camera. Users can manipulate Hatsune Miku's facial expressions, change the direction of the character's shadow and hair, and rotate the character to place it within the 360° image. The product includes a specially designed case and other features illustrated by Fuzichoco, an illustrator at Crypton Future Media.

In 2020, Hatsune Miku (also under the name Space Channel 39 and Space 39) was announced to be released as part of a DLC pack for Space Channel 5 VR: Kinda Funky News Flash on July 27 that same year. The installment allows the player to dance with Miku or attempt to defeat her in a dance battle, alongside Ulala, 88MAN, or Pudding. The DLC also unlocks a Hatsune themed outfit for Ulala (under Channel 39).

Featured music 

In August 2010, over 22,000 original songs had been written under the name Hatsune Miku. Later reports confirmed that she had 100,000 songs in 2011 to her name. Crypton's website promotes Miku's popularity having her voice used in over 100,000 unique songs.

One of the Vocaloid compilations, Exit Tunes Presents Vocalogenesis feat. Hatsune Miku, debuted at number-one on the Japanese weekly Oricon album charts dated May 31, 2010, becoming the first Vocaloid album ever to top the charts. Another album, Supercell, by the group Supercell also features a number of songs using Vocaloids. Other albums, such as 19's Sound Factory's First Sound Story and Livetune's Re:package, and Re:Mikus also feature Miku's voice. The viral Nyan Cat meme featured an Utauloid cover of "Nyanyanyanyan!" by daniwell-P, the original song featuring Miku. Another song originally using Miku, "Color", was covered by MARiA, and featured as the opening theme of the 2011 anime series Freezing.

As a virtual idol, Hatsune Miku first featured in a "live" virtual concert during Animelo Summer Live at the Saitama Super Arena on August 22, 2009. Miku later returned to Animelo Summer Live 2012: Infinity to perform "World is Mine" and "Tell Your World". Miku made her first overseas live appearance at a concert on November 21, 2009, during Anime Festival Asia (AFA) in Singapore. On March 9, 2010, Miku's first solo live performance titled "Miku no Hi Kanshasai 39's Giving Day" was opened at the Zepp Tokyo in Odaiba, Tokyo. Miku performed in the United States on July 2, 2011 at the Nokia Theater at L.A. Live during the 2011 Anime Expo in Los Angeles. The concert followed the same format as the previous "39's Giving Day" concert. Hatsune Miku performed in Japanese rock festival Summer Sonic 2013 on August 10, 2013. Hatsune Miku teamed up with designer Louis Vuitton and director Toshiki Okada for a Vocaloid opera, titled The End. It featured no human singers and took place at the Theatre du Chatelet Opera House in Paris on November 13 and 15, 2013. Another operatic work starring Hatsune Miku, a short opera buffa entitled "Weebmalion", appeared in 2018, this time featuring a real soloist, tenor Aleksander Kunach, singing with the character in a love duet written by Polish composer, Krzysztof Żelichowski. It was the first time a classically trained voice appeared alongside Vocaloid in original classical composition.

A young male prototype used for the "Project If..." series was used in Sound Horizon's musical work "Ido e Itaru Mori e Itaru Ido", labeled as the "prologue maxi". The prototype sang alongside Miku for their music and is known only by the name "Junger März_Prototype β". Hatsune Miku was the opening act for Lady Gaga's world tour ArtRave: The Artpop Ball, performing throughout the first month of Gaga's tour from May 6 to June 3, 2014.

In March 2014, Hatsune Miku and Crypton Future Media teamed up with the Japanese band Bump of Chicken to record a music video featuring a real band singing alongside Hatsune Miku in real time. This video was uploaded on March 12, 2014, and contains the song "Ray". The video is not after-edited in any way. This was made possible by Crypton's newest technology to focus characters on a screen directly to the recording camera by using a big curved screen, motion data, Wifi-sensors, movement-sensors and some older technology from Crypton.

Pharrell Williams made a remix of Livetune's song "Last Night, Goodnight" featuring Hatsune Miku. On October 8, 2014, Miku debuted on American network television as the character performed "Sharing the World" on the Late Show with David Letterman on CBS. Hatsune Miku is featured in "B Who I Want 2 B" produced by Sophie from Namie Amuro's album Genic. The 2016 Hatsune Miku Expo tour featured American electronic band Anamanaguchi as an opening act; to commemorate the tour, the band recorded a single track titled "Miku", which they performed live on the tour with Miku as an encore song. Big Boi (of Outkast) sampled Aura Qualic's song "DATA 2.0", featuring Hatsune Miku for his 2017 single "Kill Jill", also appearing in the song's music video. Slushii did a collaboration with Hatsune Miku for the song Though the Night which was released on May 11, 2018 on the single Through the Night.

In January 2020, Hatsune Miku was announced as a performer at Coachella 2020 in Indio, California, which was later cancelled due to the COVID-19 pandemic.

On December 11, 2020, Hatsune Miku was a featured artist on a remixed version of American rapper Ashnikko's song "Daisy" titled "Daisy 2.0".

Notes

References

External links 

  

Vocaloids introduced in 2007
Female characters in anime and manga
Fictional female musicians
Fictional singers
Japanese idols
Japanese popular culture
Music production software
Sega protagonists
Teenage characters in video games
Fictional characters invented for recorded music
Virtual influencers
Internet memes introduced in 2007